Andrew Gruel (born July 12, 1980) is an American chef and television personality, based in Orange County, California. He appeared as a judge on Food Network's Food Truck Face Off and as a host of FYI's Say It to My Face!, and is the founder of Slapfish, a seafood restaurant franchise that he launched in 2012 and sold to Mac Haik Enterprises in 2022. He is the founder, CEO and executive chef of Big Parm, a pizza restaurant in Tustin, California; Two Birds, a chicken restaurant in Irvine, California; Butterleaf, a plant-based restaurant in Irvine, California; and Calico Fish House, a casual seafood restaurant in Huntington Beach, California.

Early life and education
Gruel was born and raised in Bridgewater, New Jersey and graduated from the Pingry School in 1998. He said that his affinity towards cooking started at an early age, when he would fake sick to stay home from school and watch cooking shows on public-access television. While attending Bates College in Lewiston, Maine, he worked in lobster restaurants in the area. He received his culinary degree from Johnson & Wales University's College of Culinary Arts.

Career

Cooking
Gruel began his career working in fine dining restaurants, hotels and diners in New Jersey, as a cook at the Ritz Carlton in Boston and at Jack's of New London in New London, New Hampshire. He left the East Coast in 2009 to work as director of Seafood for the Future, a nonprofit program at the Aquarium of the Pacific in Long Beach, California.

After the COVID-19 pandemic forced many restaurants to shut down, Gruel started a fund in December 2020 to raise money for out-of-work restaurant industry employees, raising over $230,000 in the first three weeks. The fund, called 86 Restaurant Struggle, is a nonprofit charity that helps struggling and unemployed restaurant workers.

Television

Gruel's first television appearance was on the BBC show The Endless Feast in 2007. He served as a judge on the Food Channel's Food Truck Face Off and Chopped Junior, and also appeared on Eat St. on the Cooking Channel, Today on NBC, and On the Rocks on the Food Network. In 2015, Gruel starred as a host on season 1 of the reality television show Say It To My Face! Since 2020, he has been a frequent guest on various national news programs.

Radio
Gruel hosted a culinary radio show called Cooking with Gruel in 2015. He co-hosts the weekly The SoCal Restaurant Show on KLAA, which launched in 2012.

Television appearances

Personal life
Gruel and his wife Lauren Gruel have four children.

References

External links
Official website

1980 births
Living people
American male chefs
American television chefs
Food Network chefs
People from Bridgewater Township, New Jersey
People from Orange County, California
Pingry School alumni
Johnson & Wales University alumni
Bates College alumni
Restaurant founders